Ilmatar is a virgin spirit of the air in The Kalevala.

Ilmatar may also refer to:

 385 Ilmatar, a main-belt asteroid
 Ilmatar (album), a 2000 folk album
 MS Ilmatar, a cruise ship

See also

 Ilmater